Honey in the Horn is an album by Al Hirt released by RCA Victor. The album was produced by Chet Atkins and Steve Sholes.  The Anita Kerr Singers provided the vocals for the album. The backing band on the album consisted of saxophonist Boots Randolph, bassist Bob Moore, guitarists Ray Edenton and Grady Martin, and pianist Floyd Cramer.

The single "Java" hit No. 1 on the Easy Listening chart and No. 4 on the Billboard Hot 100 in 1964.  The album landed on the Billboard Top LPs chart, reaching No. 3.

Track listing 
 "I Can't Get Started" (Ira Gershwin, Vernon Duke)
 "Java" (Allen Toussaint, Alvin Tyler, Freddy Friday)
 "Man with a Horn" (Bonnie Lake, Eddie DeLange, Jack Jenney)
 "Tansy" (Norrie Paramor)
 "Night Theme" (Ray Peterson, Wayne Cogswell)
 "Talkin' Bout That River" (Ray Charles)
 "Fly Me to the Moon (In Other Words)" (Bart Howard)
 "To Be in Love" (Beasley Smith, Teddy Best)
 "Al Di La" (Carlo Donida, Mogol)
 "Malibu" (George Weiss, Hub Atwood)
 "Theme from a Dream" (Boudleaux Bryant)
 "I'm Movin' On" (Hank Snow)

Chart positions

Singles

References

1964 albums
Al Hirt albums
Albums produced by Chet Atkins
Albums produced by Steve Sholes
RCA Records albums